William Hatcher Davis (January 5, 1939 – May 13, 2017)  was Professor of Philosophy at Auburn University, where he taught for 47 years and served as Chair of the Department of Philosophy. He was interested in the philosophy of religion, ethics, epistemology, and pragmatism. Among his publications are The Freewill Question (The Hague: Martinus Nijhoff, 1971), Peirce's Epistemology (The Hague: Martinus Nijhoff, 1972), and "Why be Moral?" (Philosophical Inquiry 13(3–4): 1–21, 1991).

Davis had a B.A. and M.A. from Abilene Christian University and a Ph.D. from Rice University.

References

1939 births
2017 deaths
20th-century American philosophers
Philosophers of religion
Auburn University faculty
Rice University alumni
Abilene Christian University alumni